Orocrambus crenaeus is a moth in the family Crambidae. It was described by Edward Meyrick in 1885. It is endemic to New Zealand, where it is known from the South Island. The habitat consists of alpine grasslands.

The wingspan is 31–38 mm. Adults have been recorded on wing from December to February. Adults of this moth are known to pollinate Brachyscome sinclairii.

References

Crambinae
Moths described in 1885
Moths of New Zealand
Endemic fauna of New Zealand
Taxa named by Edward Meyrick
Endemic moths of New Zealand